Sahlenburg Marine Radio Station was a facility of Elbe-Weser Radio in Sahlenburg, an urban part of Cuxhaven, Germany, for marine radio service in short- and mediumwave range. Sahlenburg Marine Radio Station used first a triangular antenna, which was fixed on three guyed wooden masts, each 40 metres tall, which were erected in 1929.

In 1937 these masts were replaced by three 50-metre tall free-standing wood towers with triangular cross sections, which also carried a triangular antenna. In 1967 two of these towers were dismantled and the other was equipped with a long wire antenna.

In 1970 this tower was demolished when two 67-metre tall guyed insulated mast radiators were built. Since the shut-down of Sahlenburg Marine Radio Station, they are used for mobile phone services.

See also
 List of towers

Cuxhaven
Buildings and structures in Cuxhaven (district)
Defunct radio stations in Germany
Organisations based in Lower Saxony
Radio masts and towers in Germany
Cuxhaven
Towers completed in 1929
1929 establishments in Germany